Umyeon-dong is a dong, neighbourhood of Seocho-gu in Seoul, South Korea is part of Gangnam District and a well-known, private neighborhood for the wealthy in southern Seoul. It is a legal dong (법정동) administered under its administrative dong (행정동), Yangjae 1-dong. The first syllable of the name is derived from Umyeonsan, or Mt. Umyeon due to the geographical feature of the area has the mountain.

Mount Umyeon-san

Floods and landmines
During the 2011 Seoul floods, a landslide on an unstable slope of Mount Umyeon destroyed an apartment row, killing 17 people and may have buried about ten landmines dropped on the mountainsides during the Korean War.

Attraction
Chiwoo Craft Museum

See also 
Yangjaecheon
Administrative divisions of South Korea

References

External links
Seocho-gu official website
Seocho-gu map at the Seocho-gu official website
 The Yangjae 1-dong Resident office

Neighbourhoods of Seocho District